Pentacalia carmelana is a species of flowering plant in the family Asteraceae. It is found only in Ecuador. Its natural habitat is subtropical or tropical moist montane forests. It is threatened by habitat loss.

References

carmelana
Flora of Ecuador
Vulnerable plants
Plants described in 1993
Taxonomy articles created by Polbot